Harold Jackson may refer to:

Harold Jackson (VC) (1892–1918), received the Victoria Cross in World War I
Harold Jackson (ice hockey) (1918–1997), professional ice hockey player in the National Hockey League
Harold Jackson (American journalist), co-winner of the 1991 Pulitzer Prize for Editorial Writing
Harold Jackson (American football) (born 1946), former National Football League (NFL) player
Harold Jackson (cricketer) (1888–1979), Irish cricketer
Harold Jackson (politician) (1902–1980), Australian politician
Harold Warters Jackson (died 1972), English solicitor and Lord Mayor of Sheffield, 1930

See also
Harry Jackson (disambiguation)